Phase IV is the fourth album by Art Zoyd, released in 1982 through Recommended Records. In 1989, Phase IV would be reissued in a double compact disc with Les espaces inquiets and Archives 2.

Track listing

Personnel 
Art Zoyd
Gérard Hourbette – viola, violin, piano, synthesizer
Didier Pietton – alto saxophone, tenor saxophone, percussion
Jean-Pierre Soarez – trumpet, flugelhorn, percussion
Thierry Willems – piano, keyboards
Thierry Zaboitzeff – bass guitar, cello, acoustic guitar, vocals
Production and additional personnel
Art Zoyd – production, mixing
Etienne Conod – mixing, recording
Thierry Legrand – photography, design
Bubu Steiner – assistant recording
Recommended Records London – production

References

External links 
 

1982 albums
Art Zoyd albums
Recommended Records albums